Heinrich Christoph Wilhelm von Sigwart (31 August 1789 – 16 November 1844) was a German philosopher and logician. He was the father of Christoph von Sigwart (28 March 1830 – 4 August 1904), who also was a philosopher and logician.

Life
Sigwart was born into a family with a long history of philosophers, theologians and physicians at Remmingsheim in Württemberg. From 1813 he served as a repentant at Tübinger Stift in Tübingen, and obtained an associate professorship at the University of Tübingen in 1816. He became a full professor of philosophy at Tübingen in 1818 and wrote numerous books on the history of philosophy. He died in Stuttgart.

Works
Über den Zusammenhang des Spinozismus mit der Cartesianischen Philosophie (1816). Google (UMich)
Handbuch zu Vorlesungen über die Logik (1818; 3rd edition, 1835). Google (UCal) Google (UMich)
Handbuch der theoretischen Philosophie (1820).
Die Leibnizsche Lehre von der prästabilierten Harmonie (1822). Google (Harvard) Google (UMich)
Grundzüge der Anthropologie (1827).
De historia logicae inter Graecos usque ad Socratem commentatio (1832).
Der Spinozismus: historisch und philosophisch erläutert (1839). Google (Harvard) Google (UCal)
Die Propädeutik der Geschichte der Philosophie (1840).
Vergleichung der Rechts- und Staatstheorien des B. Spinoza und des Th. Hobbes (1842). Google (Harvard)
Geschichte der Philosophie (3 volumes, 1844).

External links 
  Biography in Allgemeine Deutsche Biographie Vol. 34, pp. 306-308 by Otto Liebmann.

References

1789 births
1844 deaths
People from the Duchy of Württemberg
German philosophers
19th-century philosophers
19th-century German people
German logicians
German Lutherans
Academic staff of the University of Tübingen
Members of the Württembergian Chamber of Deputies
19th-century German writers
19th-century German male writers
Spinoza scholars